NADH dehydrogenase [ubiquinone] iron-sulfur protein 6, mitochondrial is an enzyme that in humans is encoded by the NDUFS6 gene.

Function 

The multisubunit NADH:ubiquinone oxidoreductase (complex I) is the first enzyme complex in the electron transport chain of mitochondria. The iron-sulfur protein (IP) fraction is made up of 7 subunits, including NDUFS6.

Clinical significance 

Mutations in the NDUFS6 gene are associated with mitochondrial Complex I deficiency, and are inherited in an autosomal recessive manner. This deficiency is the most common enzymatic defect of the oxidative phosphorylation disorders. Mitochondrial complex I deficiency shows extreme genetic heterogeneity and can be caused by mutation in nuclear-encoded genes or in mitochondrial-encoded genes. There are no obvious genotype-phenotype correlations, and inference of the underlying basis from the clinical or biochemical presentation is difficult, if not impossible. However, the majority of cases are caused by mutations in nuclear-encoded genes. It causes a wide range of clinical disorders, ranging from lethal neonatal disease to adult-onset neurodegenerative disorders. Phenotypes include macrocephaly with progressive leukodystrophy, nonspecific encephalopathy, hypertrophic cardiomyopathy, myopathy, liver disease, Leigh syndrome, Leber hereditary optic neuropathy, and some forms of Parkinson disease.

In NDUFS6 mutations the presentation is typically a neonatal lactic acidosis that is swiftly fatal, coupled with multi-system failure.

See also 
 NDUFS1

References

Further reading 

 
 
 
 
 
 

Human proteins